Willy Gerber (1881 – 1949) was a Swiss equestrian. He competed in two events at the 1928 Summer Olympics.

References

1881 births
1949 deaths
Swiss male equestrians
Olympic equestrians of Switzerland
Equestrians at the 1928 Summer Olympics
Place of birth missing